Frederick George Gurnsey (18 January 1868 – 23 October 1953) was a New Zealand carver and art teacher. He was born in Newport, Monmouthshire, Wales on 18 January 1868. He did the carvings for the Bridge of Remembrance in Christchurch. The carvings in the sanctuary of the Nurses' Memorial Chapel at Christchurch Hospital are by Frederick Gurnsey and Jack Vivian.

The Oamaru stone font in All Saints' Church in Hokitika was carved by Gurnsey.

References

1868 births
1953 deaths
New Zealand educators
People from Newport, Wales
Stone carvers
Welsh emigrants to New Zealand